Do You Know Claudia? is a 2004 comedy film directed by Massimo Venier and starring Aldo, Giovanni & Giacomo.

Plot
Claudia and Giovanni have been married for 7 years, but they are going through a relationship crisis. Claudia convinces herself that to fix her problems, she has to help another person. She steals the medical chart of another patient, Giacomo, from her psychoanalyst's office and starts to date him platonically.  Giacomo, who is divorced and depressed, benefits a lot from Claudia's company and falls in love with her, with his mood improving dramatically. 

Aldo, a taxi driver, is Claudia's lover and is convinced that Giovanni is onto him, seeing him everywhere. In the meanwhile, Giovanni becomes suspicious and starts following his wife around, erroneously concluding that Giacomo is her wife's lover. 

Aldo, Giovanni and Giacomo get involved in a car crash, beginning to hang out together while Giovanni thinks Giacomo is his wife's lover and Aldo knows Giovanni is Claudia's husband. After having shared this knowledge between them, the three decides to drive to Calabria together, where Claudia has isolated herself, and ask her to choose one of them. During the journey, Aldo realises that there has been a case of mistaken identity. In fact, Claudia is not the same Claudia he was involved romantically with. 

In the meanwhile, Giacomo realises he is not really in love with Claudia and decides to go back to his ex-wife, hoping in vain to get back together. Giovanni and Aldo get back with their respective Cladia, but the latter couple does not last for long. Aldo and Giovanni end up becoming good friends.

Cast
Aldo Baglio as Aldo
Giovanni Storti as Giovanni
Giacomo Poretti as Giacomo
Paola Cortellesi as Claudia
Sandra Ceccarelli as Silvia
Ottavia Piccolo as the psychoanalyst
Rossy de Palma as Claudia (Aldo's lover)
Marco Messeri as Vanni Maceria
Silvana Fallisi as Luciana
Ruffin Doh Zeneyoun as Taribo
Max Pisu as taxi's customer

References

External links
 

2004 comedy films
2004 films
Films directed by Massimo Venier
Italian comedy films
2000s Italian-language films